Leendert A.B. Rojer is a Curaçaoan politician. He was Minister Plenipotentiary of Curaçao between 13 April 2017 and 1 June 2017. The coalition parties of the Gilmar Pisas cabinet asked him to take care of the position until a new government was formed after the 2017 Curaçao general election. He was succeeded by Anthony Begina on 1 June 2017.

References

Year of birth missing (living people)
Living people
Ministers plenipotentiary (Curaçao)